Nay Moe Naing (born 13 December 1997), is a Burmese footballer currently playing as a midfielder. In December 2020, Nay Moe Naing transferred to   Hanthawaddy United with free agent.

References

1997 births
Living people
Burmese footballers
Myanmar international footballers
Association football midfielders